Anne Godard (born December 1971 in Paris) is a French writer.

Works 
 2006 : L'Inconsolable, Paris, Éditions de Minuit, Grand prix RTL-Lire

References

External links 
 Anne Godard, la discrète on L'Express (1 April 2006)
 Anne Goadard on France Culture
 L'Inconsolable on Le Matricule des Anges
 Anne Godard on Babelio

21st-century French non-fiction writers
Writers from Paris
1971 births
Living people
21st-century French women writers